Kona is a department or commune of Mouhoun Province in western Burkina Faso. Its capital lies at the town of Kona. According to the 1996 census the department has a total population of 18,033.

Towns and villages
 Kona	(2 704 inhabitants) (capital)
 Blé	(767 inhabitants)
 Dafina	(1 590 inhabitants)
 Dangouna	(1 158 inhabitants)
 Goulo	(458 inhabitants)
 Kouana	(1 488 inhabitants)
 Lah	(3 239 inhabitants)
 Nana	(1 057 inhabitants)
 Pie	(1 690 inhabitants)
 Sanfle	(564 inhabitants)
 Soungoule	(320 inhabitants)
 Tâ	(650 inhabitants)
 Tena	(422 inhabitants)
 Tona	(1 005 inhabitants)
 Yankoro	(115 inhabitants)
 Yoana	(568 inhabitants)
 Zina	(238 inhabitants)

References

Departments of Burkina Faso
Mouhoun Province